Parahathlia lineella is a species of beetle in the family Cerambycidae. It was described by Hope in 1842.

References

Apomecynini
Beetles described in 1842